Marianna Gamache is an American politician who has served in the Vermont House of Representatives since 2014.

References

Living people
State University of New York at Old Westbury alumni
21st-century American politicians
21st-century American women politicians
Members of the Vermont House of Representatives
Women state legislators in Vermont
Politicians from Brooklyn
Year of birth missing (living people)